The existence of the earliest forts in India have been substantiated by documentation and excavation. In the medieval times, the architecture of the forts had both Hindu and Muslim influence. The forts constructed by the British initially opted for simple designs. The existing castles are continually modified and many of them are privately owned.

Etymology 
Most of the forts in India are actually castles or fortresses. But when the British Government in India were cataloging them in the 17th–19th century they used the word forts as it was common in Britain then. All fortifications whether European or Indian were termed forts. Thereafter this became the common usage in India. In local languages, the fort names are suffixed by local word for fort thus usage of the Sanskrit word durga, or Urdu word qila or the Hindi word garh or gad in Rajasthan, and Maharashtra is common. For example, Suvarnadurg, Mehrangarh, Sudhagad etc. Indian

Forts in ancient India  
Three major methods were used for the construction of ancient Indian forts. The first consisted of earthen ramparts. Often they were constructed of the sand which was dug out of the ditch surrounding the fort. The second of rubble with earth on the outside which was more sturdy. The third type of construction was with stone and masonry work. The last was the strongest. Often materials from demolished forts were reused in the building of new forts.

By 4th Century BCE, fortified cities were common in India. The largest ones were between the city of Mathura (on the Yamuna river) and Magadha (on the Ganges). Another series of forts in the south, was on the Ujjain (on the Narmada) leading into the Deccan. These are inferred by the remains of fort walls and bastions seen on excavation at Rajagriha and at several sites in the Gangetic plain notably Kaushambi. At the latter site huge walls of burnt brick, which look like they have been battered.

There are few descriptions of these ancient structures. The most noted is the one by Megasthenes, an ambassador of Seleucus I Nicator to the court of Chandragupta Maurya. He describes Pataliputra as being guarded by a ditch with wooden walls. The fort had 570 towers and 54 gates with colonnaded halls decorated with gold and silver. One such hall has been excavated and is one of the oldest stone structures in India.

Types of ancient Indian forts

Though most of the structures have been decayed and are lost, India's legacy of ancient forts is seen mostly in the shastras (ancient Indian treatises) and in the reliefs on stupas. On some of the early relief work, the carvings indicate that ancient Indian forts has crenellations, embrasures and sloping walls.

The Arthashastra the Indian treatise on military strategy describes six major types of forts differentiated by their major mode of defense:

 Jala-durga (Water fort)
 Antardvipa-durga (island fortress): surrounded by natural (sea or river) water bodies. E.g. Murud-Janjira.
 Sthala-durga (plain fortress): surrounded by artificial moats or irrigated by a river e.g. Deeg Fort, Lohagarh Fort.
 Dhanvana- or Maru-durga (Desert Fort): Surrounded by an arid area of at least 5 yojanas (73 km).
Giri-durga (Hill fort)
 Prantara-durga: Located on a flat hill summit. E.g. medieval forts such as Chittor, Gwalior and Ranthambore.
 Giri-parshva-durga: The fortifications and civilian structures extend down to the hill slope (not just the summit).
 Guha-durga: Located in a valley surrounded by hills, where the outposts and the signal towers are located.
 Vana-durga (Forest fort): Surrounded by a dense forest over a distance of at least 4 kroshas (14.6 km).
 Khanjana-durga, built on a fen surrounded by thorny forests.
 Sthambha-durga, built in the forest among tall trees; lacks sufficient water sources.
Mahi-durga (Earthen fort)
 Mrid-durga: surrounded by earthen walls
 Parigha-durga: Surrounded by earthen walls, as well as stone or brick walls. The walls are at least 5.4 m high and their width is half of their height.
 Panka-durga: Surrounded by fens or quicksand
 Nri-durga (Human fort)
 Defended by a large number of loyal and experienced warriors. Usually a city fortress, populated by a substantial garrison.

Each of these types had its own advantages and disadvantages. For example, according to the Manusmṛti, the forest fort suffers from monkey attacks, the earthen forts get swarmed with rodents, the water forts were plagued by diseases etc. The Manusmṛti considers the Hill fort to be the best defensive structure. Some Sanskrit text consider hill forts to be the abode of gods and hence auspicious. The Mahabharata describes the Human fort as the most effective fortification.

Forts in medieval India  

With the advent of the Muslims, closely followed by the introduction of artillery in the 16th century there were several changes to the construction and design of forts. These changes were similar to the changes that took place in Western forts with the advent of gunpowder, i.e. the lowering of walls, thickening of walls, further pushing out of bastions etc.
The construction of a citadel in the centre and putting in more area between the citadel and the walls was characteristic of Muslim forts (influenced in turn by the Norman motte and bailey). Classic examples of such structures are the Golkonda and the Berar fort.

The gates of medieval Indian forts were highly decorated. Two distinct styles are seen. The Hindu style with a lintel and the Mughal style with an arch. Gates in Indian forts were often high and wide to allow elephants to pass. Often they had rows of sharp, stout iron spikes to dissuade an attacking army from using elephants to break down the gates. Such a gate with spikes can be seen on the Shaniwarwada fort, Pune. The walls of the forts were often looked higher from the outside than the inside as the forts made use of the natural rock formations on hills. This not only gave an illusion of greater height but also lead to the lower walls of the fort to be entirely made up of natural rock providing almost a perfect defense against the use of a battering ram or elephants to tear down the walls. The main gate to the forts was located mostly facing north direction, this was to avoid its deterioration by the rains, winds and the sun.

Construction
Stone was the most important material for building fortifications in medieval India. Walls were erected by one of the following three construction methods. A wall could be an earthen rampart faced with stone on both sides. The rampart was built using the earth excavated while digging the ditch, with three-quarters of it used
for building a rampart and one-quarter for levelling out the surface inside the fortress and in front of the ditch. Facing the rampart with stone allowed for the erection of higher and steeper walls than those possible with a purely earthen rampart. The structure had a substantial shortcoming, however: an earthen core accumulated water, which could destroy the stone shell. Drainage channels were therefore installed along the length of the wall from top to bottom. The main binding material for construction was Lime mortar.

The second method consisted of filling the space between the outer layers with earth mixed with rubble. This core was considerably harder than simply using rammed earth. The third and most advanced method involved the use of
mortar. A rubble-built wall fastened with mortar was strong and long lasting. Construction methods depended, however, on the materials available.

In medieval India, several reports exist of the practice of burying humans either dead or alive in the foundations of fort walls, to ensure their stability, being widely followed. It was believed that the ghosts of those sacrificed as such would keep evil spirits away. During the building of the Sri Qila, Delhi Alauddin Khalji is reported to have buried 8,000 skulls of Mughals killed by him into the foundation. During the building of Purandar Fort one its bastions gave way several times. The king of Berar then ordered his minister an Esaji Naik Chive to bury a first-born son and his wife into the foundation of the bastion. This was promptly done and after a further offering of gold and bricks. When the bastion was finished Esaji Naik was given possession of the fort and the father of the sacrificed boy was rewarded with two villages. Along with the fortification, emphasis was also given for construction of rock cut water cistern, ponds, wells and lakes. To avoid evaporation of water, the water bodies were covered. At times rooms were built close to water bodies to keep the temperature low.

Many Indian fortifications have parapets with peculiarly shaped merlons and complicated systems of loopholes, which differ substantially from similar structures in other countries. Typical Indian merlons were semicircular and pointed at the top, although they were sometimes fake: the parapet may be solid and the merlons shown in relief on the outside (as at Chittorgarh). What was unique is the arrangement and direction of loopholes. Loopholes were made both in the merlons themselves, and under the crenels. They could either look forward (to command distant approaches) or downward (to command the foot of the wall). Sometimes a merion was pierced with two or three loopholes, but more often, one loophole was divided into two or three slits by horizontal or vertical partitions. The shape of loopholes, as well as the shape of merlons, need not have been the same everywhere in the castle, as shown by Kumbhalgarh.

Forts constructed by the British

With the advent of the East India Company, the British established trading posts along the coast. The need for security against local rajas as well as other European rival nations led to the construction of forts at each post. Mumbai fort, Fort William in Kolkata, Fort St George in Chennai were the main bastions constructed. These cities developed from the small townships outside the forts. Parsimony of the East India Company, non-availability of trained engineers and use of local materials and artisans resulted in the simple design and construction initially. The vulnerability of these earlier forts, hostilities with the French and the growing might of the Company resulted in stronger and more complex designs for the second round of construction, the design of Fort St George reflecting the influences of the French engineer Vauban.

Current state
Although no Indian forts were destroyed by sudden disasters, there are several which were abandoned due to the ambitions of their rulers and have consequently deteriorated over time. Very few castles have survived unchanged since the early Middle Ages or even since the 14th-15th centuries: most of those built in the 10th-15th centuries were later rebuilt and altered. Castles were still used as living quarters until the 19th-20th centuries, and so were continually modified. Even now, some of them are private property.

See also 

List of forts in India
Hill Forts of Rajasthan

Notes 

Exploration of forts on maps

Bibliography